The 2022–23 Women's Senior One Day Trophy was the 17th edition of the women's List A cricket competition in India. It took place from 18 January to 7 February 2023, with 37 teams competing in five round-robin divisions. Railways won the tournament, their fourteenth title, beating Karnataka in the final.

Competition format
37 teams competed in the tournament, divided into two groups of eight and three groups of seven, playing each other side in their group once. The winner of each group progressed straight to the quarter-finals, whilst the second-placed team in each group and the best third-placed team progressed to the pre-quarter-finals.

The groups worked on a points system with positions within the groups being based on the total points. Points were awarded as follows:

Win: 4 points. 
Tie: 2 points. 
Loss: 0 points. 
No Result/Abandoned: 2 points.

If points in the final table were equal, teams were separated by most wins, then head-to-head record, then Net Run Rate.

League stage

Points tables

Group A

Group B

Group C

Group D

Group E

 Advanced to the quarter-finals.
 Advanced to the pre-quarter-finals.

Source: BCCI

Fixtures

Group A

Group B

Group C

Group D

Group E

Knockout stages

Pre-quarter-finals

Quarter-finals

Semi-finals

Final

Statistics

Most runs

Source: CricketArchive

Most wickets

Source: CricketArchive

References

Women's Senior One Day Trophy
Women's Senior One Day Trophy
2023 in Indian cricket